Roberto Jonas Alonso (born 7 June 1967) is an Andorran footballer. He has played for the Andorra national team.

National team statistics

International goal
Scores and results list Andorra's goal tally first.

References

1967 births
Living people
Andorran footballers
Andorra international footballers

Association football defenders